The basic exchange telephone radio service or BETRS is a fixed radio service where a multiplexed, digital radio link is used as the last segment of the local loop to provide wireless telephone service to subscribers in remote areas. BETRS technology was developed in the mid-1980s and allows up to four subscribers to use a single radio channel pair, simultaneously, without interfering with one another.

In the US, this service may operate in the paired 152/158 and 454/459 MHz bands and on 10 channel blocks in the 816-820/861-865 MHz bands. BETRS may be licensed only to state-certified carriers in the area where the service is provided and is considered a part of the public switched telephone network (PSTN) by state regulators.

Regulation of this service currently resides in parts 1 and 22 of the Code of Federal Regulations (CFR), Subtitle 47 on Telecommunications, and may be researched or ordered through the Government Printing Office (GPO).

Sources
Federal Communications Commission (Wireless Bureau)

External links
Federal Communications Commission website
Government Printing Office website

Local loop
Mobile telecommunications standards